Granigyra piona is a species of sea snail, a marine gastropod mollusk, unassigned in the superfamily Seguenzioidea.

Description
The shell grows to a height of 2 mm.

Distribution
This species occurs in the Pacific Ocean off the Galapagos Islands.

References

External links
 To USNM Invertebrate Zoology Mollusca Collection
 To World Register of Marine Species
 

piona
Gastropods described in 1919